The President of The Citadel is the chief administrator of The Citadel. Previously known as the Superintendent, the title was changed in 1921 during the tenure of Colonel Oliver J. Bond.

The Citadel, located in Charleston, South Carolina, was a component of the South Carolina Military Academy from 1845 to 1865. The Arsenal Academy, located in Columbia, South Carolina made up the other portion of the Academy, with cadets receiving their initial training in the first year at The Arsenal before moving to The Citadel to complete the final three years of their education. Each campus had its own Superintendent, but reported to the same Board of Visitors. Initially, both superintendents held the rank of captain, but in 1845 The Citadel's superintendent became a Major.

On April 12, 2018, The Citadel announced that General Glenn M. Walters was selected from a pool of four finalists to lead the college after the retirement of Lt. General John Rosa, slated for June 30, 2018.  Walters assumed the Presidency on October 5, 2018.

Presidents of The Citadel today occupy a home on campus known as Quarters One.

The Citadel

Superintendents

Presidents

The Arsenal
Initially created as a separate academy, The Arsenal in Columbia, South Carolina became an auxiliary to The Citadel in 1845. Together, the schools comprised the South Carolina Military Academy. Cadets completed their first year at The Arsenal before moving to The Citadel for the remainder of their tenure. In May, 1865, the remainder of the Battalion of State Cadets, which was primarily composed of Arsenal cadets, disbanded at Newberry, South Carolina as one of the last Confederate units to disband. The Arsenal never reopened, its buildings mostly destroyed in the burning of Columbia by General Sherman. One building that remains is currently the used as the South Carolina Governor's Mansion.

Superintendents

References

Presidents of The Citadel, The Military College of South Carolina
Citadel